The 1975–76 Macedonian Republic League was the 33rd since its establishment. FK Rabotnichki won their 9th championship title.

Participating teams

Final table

External links
SportSport.ba
Football Federation of Macedonia 

Macedonian Football League seasons
Yugo
3